James Hingerty (q3 1875 – 1909) was an English footballer who played in the Football League for Stoke.

Career
Hingerty was born in Walsall and joined the Army as a teenager where he played football with the North Staffordshire Regiment. He left the army in 1896 and joined Stoke where he scored six goals in twelve matches during the 1896–97 season and he played the same number of matches in the following season scoring twice. In 1897 he left Stoke and joined Rushden Town.

Career statistics

References

1875 births
1909 deaths
Sportspeople from Walsall
English footballers
Association football forwards
Stoke City F.C. players
Rushden Town F.C. players
English Football League players